Hojjatabad (also Romanized as Ḩojjatābād) is a village in Rezvaniyeh Rural District, in the Central District of Tiran and Karvan County, Isfahan Province, Iran. At the 2006 census, its population was 11, in 8 families.

References 

Populated places in Tiran and Karvan County